Brooklyn Community Board 9 is a New York City community board that encompasses the Brooklyn neighborhoods of Crown Heights, Prospect Lefferts Gardens, and Wingate. It is delimited by Ocean Avenue and Flatbush Avenue on the west, Eastern Parkway on the north, Rochester, East New York and Utica  Avenues on the east, as well as by Clarkson Avenue on the south.

Its former acting chairperson Laura Imperiale, and district manager Pearl R. Miles. Miles were accused of "doing things without involving the community," per another community leader.

As of the 2000 US Census, the Community Board oversaw a population of 104,014, down from 110,715 in 1990 but up from 96,667 in 1980.
Of them (as of 2000), 79,466 (76.4%) are African-American, 11,733 (11.3%) are White non Hispanic, 8,581 (8.2%) of Hispanic origins, 2,416 (2.3%) of two or more race, 819 (0.8%) Asian or Pacific Islander, 816 (0.8%) of some other race, and 183 (0.2%) American Indian or Native Alaskan,.
36.4% of the population benefit from public assistance as of 2004, up from 20.8% in 2000.

References

External links
Profile of the Community Board (PDF)
Official website of the Community Board 
Brooklyn neighborhood map

Community boards of Brooklyn
Crown Heights, Brooklyn